Young & Reckless is Dirty Penny's second and final album, released on September 17, 2009.  It was produced by Johnny Lima, and recorded at Suspect Studios in San Jose, California.

Track listing 
All tracks written and composed by Ian MacPherson, Matt Biggam, Spencer Joseph, and Tyle Molinaro.

 "If I Were You I'd Hate Me Too" – 3:27  
 "In Luv with Insanity" – 3:01
 "LCS" – 3:01
 "On My Sleeve" – 3:35
 "Goin' Out in Style" – 3:34
 "Stand on My Own" – 3:36
 "Sleeping Dogs" – 3:27
 "Devil in Me" – 3:23
 "Dead at 16" – 3:38
 "Livin' Rock" – 3:20
 "Run to You" – 4:26
 "Crash and Burn" – 3:17
 "Wrecking Ball" – 3:46

References 

2009 albums
Dirty Penny albums